John Vincent "Jack" Powell (2 November 1910 – 27 July 1982) was a British middle-distance runner. He competed in the 800 metres at the 1932 Summer Olympics and the 1936 Summer Olympics. He also competed for England in the 880 yards at the 1934 British Empire Games in London.

Early life and education
Born at Harrow, London, a twin (one of six children), Powell was educated at Harrow County Grammar School, where he was an outstanding athlete, winning inter-school competitions. Although often referred to as "Jack", he preferred to be called "John".

Career
Powell represented London Athletic Club and was the 1936 AAA champion. As a middle-distance runner, he competed in the 800 metres at the 1932 Summer Olympics and the 1936 Summer Olympics, as well as in the 880 yards at the 1934 British Empire Games in London.

Powell was a journalist; he wrote for the Wembley Observer and Harrow Observer from 1928 to 1937, as well as for various sports papers. He was also a broadcaster and lecturer, a member of the British Council in Iraq. He served as a squadron leader in the RAF during the Second World War, including in the Middle East, and was mentioned in dispatches three times. After the war, he began poultry farming in Sussex, where he lived at Bognor Regis.

Personal life
In 1945, he married Eleanor Sybil Ruth Archdeacon.

References

External links
 

1910 births
1982 deaths
Athletes (track and field) at the 1932 Summer Olympics
Athletes (track and field) at the 1936 Summer Olympics
British male middle-distance runners
Olympic athletes of Great Britain
People from Harrow, London
Athletes (track and field) at the 1934 British Empire Games
Commonwealth Games competitors for England
Royal Air Force personnel of World War II
Royal Air Force squadron leaders